Cambarus elkensis, the Elk River crayfish, is a species of crayfish in the family Cambaridae. It is found in North America.

The IUCN conservation status of Cambarus elkensis is "VU", vulnerable. The species faces a high risk of endangerment in the medium term. The IUCN status was reviewed in 2010.

References

Further reading

 
 
 

IUCN Red List vulnerable species
Crustaceans described in 1993
1993 in West Virginia
Cambaridae